Târlișua is a commune in Bistrița-Năsăud County, Transylvania, Romania. It is composed of ten villages: Agrieș (Felsőpusztaegres), Agrieșel (Alsóegres), Borleasa (Lonkafalva), Cireași, Lunca Sătească, Molișet (Molisetitanya), Oarzina (Úrivölgy), Răcăteșu (Rakatyestanya), Șendroaia (Sándorvölgy), and Târlișua.

The commune is located in the northwestern part of the county, on the border with Maramureș County. It lies on the banks of the river Ilișua and its affluent, Valea Lungă. 

Sights

Natives
  (1941–2012), teacher and writer
  (1913–2015), Greek Catholic priest
 Liviu Rebreanu (1885–1944), novelist

References

Communes in Bistrița-Năsăud County
Localities in Transylvania